= Sayyora Sultanova =

Soviet-Uzbekistani Communist Party politician

Sayyora Umarovna Sultanova (Russian: Сайёра Умаровна Султанова; born 1937) was a Soviet-Uzbekistani Communist Party politician. She served as Minister of Social Security for Uzbek SSR.
